Joseph S. Mack (1919-2005) was a Democratic member of the Michigan Senate, representing much of the Upper Peninsula from 1967 to 1990.

Born to a mining family, Mack was one of 10 children. After graduating high school, Mack attended the Milwaukee Vocational School and studied steel fabrication. He worked on the Manhattan Project during World War II. Mack returned to Ironwood in 1946 and began his involvement in politics.

Mack was elected to the Michigan House of Representatives in 1960 and served two terms, representing Gogebic County. In 1964, he won election to the Michigan Senate and served 26 years, resigning in 1990 after being charged with fraudulently obtaining travel reimbursement. While in the Senate, Mack focused his efforts on economic development, outdoor recreation, and natural resources. He chaired the Upper Peninsula Industrial and Economic Affairs Committee and the Conservation Committee, the latter to the chagrin of environmentalists.

He was an unsuccessful candidate for Congress in 1956 and 1958.

Mack died April 20, 2005, aged 85.

References

1919 births
2005 deaths
People from Ironwood, Michigan
Milwaukee Area Technical College alumni
Manhattan Project people
Democratic Party Michigan state senators
Democratic Party members of the Michigan House of Representatives
Michigan politicians convicted of crimes
20th-century American politicians